Chromodomain protein, Y-like 2 is a protein in humans that is encoded by the CDYL2 gene. It localizes to the nucleus, where it acts as a chromatin reader recognizing trimethylation of Histone H3 lysine 9 and repressing transcription.

References

Further reading

External links 
 PDBe-KB provides an overview of all the structure information available in the PDB for Human Chromodomain Y-like protein 2 (CDYL2)

Human proteins